Eric Mayne (April 28, 1865 – February 10, 1947) was an American actor.

Mayne was born in Dublin and was a star on stage in London in the early 20th century, at the London Lyceum and at Drury Lane.

He appeared in the films The New York Peacock, Wife Number Two, Her Hour, Help! Help! Police!, Marooned Hearts, The Conquering Power, Turn to the Right, The Prisoner of Zenda, Pawned, Dr. Jack, My American Wife, The Christian, Suzanna, Prodigal Daughters, Human Wreckage, Her Reputation, Cameo Kirby, The Drums of Jeopardy, Black Oxen, The Yankee Consul, Gerald Cranston's Lady, Her Night of Romance, The Scarlet Honeymoon, Cyclone Cavalier, East Lynne, Hearts and Spangles, Folly of Youth, Money to Burn, Married Alive, The Canyon of Adventure, Rackety Rax, Night of Terror, The Drunkard and Ticket to Paradise, among others.

Mayne died in his sleep in Hollywood, California, on February 10, 1947.

References

External links

 

1865 births
1947 deaths
20th-century American male actors
American male film actors